Ciguli (1957 – 31 October 2014) (born Angel Jordanov Kapsov) was a Bulgarian Chalga (pop-folk) singer and accordionist of Turkish-Romani descent, who became popular in Turkey.

His real name was Ahmet, however, at the time of his birth Bulgarian authorities did not allow Turks to use their own name thus they refused to register his real name in registry, although his family continued to call him Ahmet. His name was registered as Angel Jordanov Kapsov.

The best known songs of Ciguli include "Binnaz", "Şiki Şiki Baba" and "Yapma Bana Numara!"

He also played the accordion with Sibel Can and İbrahim Tatlıses.

Discography
 1999: Binnaz
 2000: Horozum
 2003: Sabır Yaaa Sabır
 2006: Ben Akordiyonum 
 2007: Safinaz - Tersyorum
 2010: Sensiz Kaldım Şimdi

Filmography
 1998: Bizim Sokak
 2003: Neredesin Firuze
 2004: Biz Boşanıyoruz
 2012: Bu Son Olsun
 2014: Olur Olur
 2015: Limonata (tyre repair mechanic)

References

20th-century Bulgarian male singers
21st-century Bulgarian male singers
Bulgarian folk-pop singers
Bulgarian accordionists
Romani in Bulgaria
Bulgarian Turks
1957 births
2014 deaths